Coralie Bentz (born 21 May 1996) is a French cross-country skier. She competed in the  Women's 10 kilometre classical, and Women's 15 kilometre skiathlon, at the 2022 Winter Olympics. She competed at the 2021–22 FIS Cross-Country World Cup.

Cross-country skiing results
All results are sourced from the International Ski Federation (FIS).

Olympic Games

World Cup

Season standings

References

External links

1996 births
Living people
French female cross-country skiers
Cross-country skiers at the 2022 Winter Olympics
Olympic cross-country skiers of France
21st-century French women